Louis Borders is the founder of both Borders (in 1971) and Webvan (in 1996).

The original Borders bookstore was located in Ann Arbor, Michigan, where it was founded in 1971 by brothers Tom and Louis Borders during their undergraduate and graduate years at the University of Michigan. The Borders brothers' inventory system tailored each store's offerings to its community.

Borders studied mathematics at the University of Michigan during his undergraduate years and MIT for graduate work.

References

Date of birth missing (living people)
Living people
University of Michigan College of Literature, Science, and the Arts alumni
American booksellers
Year of birth missing (living people)
American company founders
Massachusetts Institute of Technology alumni
People from Ann Arbor, Michigan